The 2010 NCAA Division 1 softball tournament was held from May 20 through June 8, 2010 and is part of the 2010 NCAA Division 1 softball season.  The 64 NCAA Division 1 college softball teams were selected out of an eligible 284 teams on May 16, 2010.  30 teams were awarded an automatic bid as champions of their conference, and 34 teams were selected at-large by the NCAA Division 1 Softball Selection Committee. The tournament culminated with eight teams playing in the 2010 Women's College World Series at ASA Hall of Fame Stadium in Oklahoma City, Oklahoma.  UCLA won their record 11th championship, defeating Arizona in the final.

Automatic bids

National seeds
Teams in "italics" advanced to super regionals.
Teams in "bold" advanced to Women's College World Series.

Alabama

Florida
UCLA

 
 Arizona

Regionals and super regionals

Tuscaloosa Super Regional

Columbia Super Regional

Los Angeles Super Regional

Gainesville Super Regional

Seattle Super Regional

Athens Super Regional

Tucson Super Regional

Ann Arbor Super Regional

Women's College World Series

Rule changes

Field dimensions

Whereas in previous years, the outfield fence was set at 190 feet from home plate and standing four feet in height, the fence was moved back to 200 feet and raised to a height of six feet for this year's tournament.  Despite the change, the 2010 Series saw a record-breaking number of home runs resulting from "some of the power brought into the game by composite-barreled bats."

Illegal pitching

The 2010 WCWS was marked by a proliferation of illegal pitch calls, following a memo by NCAA Softball Secretary Rules Editor Dee Abrahamson outlining an increased emphasis on legal pitching.  Arizona Wildcats pitcher Kenzie Fowler, in particular, was cited for eight illegal pitches in Arizona's first-round 9-0 loss to Tennessee, and a further eight illegal pitches in Arizona's second-round 4-3 win over Washington; Fowler was cited for 16 of the 22 illegal pitches called in the first eight games of the tournament.  Wildcats coach Mike Candrea reacted by saying that "the officials were way too involved in [the Tennessee] game," and that the citation of illegal pitches was "sporadic."

Participants

† Excludes results of the pre-NCAA Women's College World Series of 1969 through 1981.

Results

Bracket

Game results

Championship game

Final standings

WCWS records
Home runs, game (individual), 2 - tied with Yvonne Gutierrez (UCLA, 1992), Lindsey Collins (Arizona, 1999), & Francesca Enea (Florida, 2008)
In Game 2, Andrea Harrison hit two home runs in UCLA's 16-3 win over Florida.
In Game 7, Brittany Schutte hit two home runs in Florida's 5-0 win over Missouri.
In Game 14, Megan Langenfeld hit two home runs in UCLA's 8-inning 6-5 win over Arizona.
In Game 15, Stacie Chambers hit two home runs in Arizona's game against UCLA.
Home runs, Series (individual), 4 - new record, surpassing former record of 3 (Gutierrez in 1992; Toni Mascarenas in 2001; Tairia Mims in 2003)
Megan Langenfeld hit one home run in Game 2, two home runs in Game 14, and one home run in Game 15.
Andrea Harrison hit two home runs in Game 2, one home run in Game 5, and a grand slam in Game 15.
Stacie Chambers hit one home run in Game 13, one home run in Game 14, and two home runes in Game 15.
Multi-home run games, Series (total), 4 - new record, surpassing former record of one (Gutierrez in 1992, Collins in 1999, & Enea in 2008)
Multi-home run games, Series (team), 2 by UCLA - new record, surpassing former record of one (UCLA in 1992, Arizona in 1999, Florida in 2008)
Home runs, Series (team), 14 by UCLA - new record
Samantha Camuso hit UCLA's 14th home run of the Series in Game 15.
Home runs, Series (total), 35 - new record, surpassing former record of 24 (2009)
K'Lee Arredondo hit the 24th home run of the Series in Game 13
Megan Langenfeld hit the 25th home run of the Series in Game 14.
Stacie Chambers hit the 35th home run of the Series in Game 15.
RBI, Series (individual), 11 - new record, surpassing former record of 7 (Niki Williams in 2009)
In Game 15, Andrea Harrison hit a grand slam to collect her 8th, 9th, 10th, and 11th RBI
Runs, Series (total), 141 - new record, surpassing former record of 120 (2010)
In Game 15, UCLA scored the Tournament's 120th, 121st, 122nd and 123rd runs in a 4-run second inning, while Arizona scored the Tournament's 141st run in the bottom of the ninth inning.

Championship game records
Home runs (total), 7 by UCLA and Arizona (4 and 3 in Game 2) - new record, surpassing former record of 3
Grand slams (individual), 1 (Andrea Harrison in Game 2) - new record
Grand slams (team), 1 (UCLA in Game 2) - new record
Runs (team), 15 by UCLA (Game 2) - new record, surpassing former record of 11 (ASU, 2008 Game 2)
Runs (total), 24 by UCLA and Arizona (15 and 9 in Game 2) - new record, surpassing former record of 19
Hits (team), 19 by UCLA (Game 2) - new record, surpassing former record of 17 (Iowa, 27 May 1995)
RBI (team), 15 by UCLA (Game 2) - new record, surpassing former record of 11 (ASU, 2008 Game 2)

Note: The above records exclude those of the pre-NCAA Women's College World Series of 1969 through 1981.

Most Outstanding Player
Megan Langenfeld was unanimously voted the tournament's Most Outstanding Player.  She batted .705, going 12-for-17 with four home runs and nine RBIs, as well as reaching base in 18 of 23 plate appearances for an OBP of .782 with four walks and two hit by pitch.

References

External links
http://www.ncaa.com/brackets/2010/ncaa_bracket_DI_softball.html
http://www.ncaa.com/sports/ncaa-w-softbl-body.html

NCAA Division I softball tournament
NCAA Division I softball tournament, 2010